Hadiabad is a historic sub-town in the city of Phagwara in Punjab (India), about  west of Phagwara sub-town. It is the biggest area in size on the western part of the city. Many Sikh followers worship at the gurdwara Chhevin Patshahl.

ਇਤਿਹਾਸ ਗੁਰੁਦਵਾਰਾ ਪਾਤਸ਼ਾਹੀ ਛੇਵੀਂ,ਹਦੀਆਬਾਦ, ਫਗਵਾੜਾ,ਕਪੂਰਥਲਾ,ਪੰਜਾਬ।।
ਮੀਰੀ ਪੀਰੀ ਦੇ ਮਾਲਕ,ਦੇਗ ਤੇਗ ਦੇ ਧਨੀ,ਧੰਨ ਸ਼੍ਰੀ ਗੁਰੂ ਹਰਿਗੋਬਿੰਦ ਸਾਹਿਬ ਜੀ ਸ਼੍ਰੀ ਕਰਤਾਰਪੁਰ ਦੀ ਜੰਗ ਜਿੱਤਣ ਉਪਰੰਤ ਪਲਾਹੀ ਨਗਰ ਤੋਂ ਹੁੰਦੇ ਹੋਏ ਗੁਰੂਘਰ ਦੇ ਅਨਿਨ ਸ਼ਰਧਾਲੂ ਭਾਈ ਪਾਖਰ ਜੀ ਨੂੰ ਮੇਹਟਾਂ ਪਿੰਡ ਵਿਖੇ ਦਰਸ਼ਨ ਦੇਕੇ ਨਿਹਾਲ ਕਰਨ ਉਪਰੰਤ ਸਤਿਗੁਰ ਜੀ ਤਿੰਨ ਜੁਲਾਈ 1634 ਈਸਵੀ ਨੂੰ ਹਦੀਆਬਾਦ ਨਗਰ ਵਿਖੇ ਆਣ ਵਿਸ਼ਰਾਮ ਕੀਤਾ। ਉਕਤ ਨਗਰ ਬਾਰ੍ਹਵੀਂ ਸਦੀ ਵਿੱਚ ਤੁਗਲਕ ਵੰਸ਼ ਨੇ ਵਸਾਇਆ ਸੀ ਅਤੇ ਇਸਦਾ ਪਹਿਲਾਂ ਨਾਂ ਤਕੀਆਬਾਦ ਸੀ। ਮੀਰੀ ਪੀਰੀ ਦੇ ਮਾਲਕ ਜਦੋਂ ਇਸ ਨਗਰ ਵਿਖੇ ਪਧਾਰੇ ਤਾਂ ਹਦੀਆਬਾਦ ਨਗਰ ਅਤੇ ਇਲਾਕਾ ਨਿਵਾਸੀ ਸ਼ਰਧਾਲੂਆਂ ਨੇ ਗੁਰੂ ਜੀ ਦੇ ਦਰਸ਼ਨਾਂ ਲਈ ਵਹੀਰਾਂ ਘੱਤ ਦਿੱਤੀਆਂ ਅਤੇ ਦਿਨ ਰਾਤ ਉਨ੍ਹਾਂ ਦੀ ਟਹਿਲ ਸੇਵਾ ਵਿੱਚ ਜੁੱਟ ਗਈਆਂ। ਇਸੇ ਹੀ ਸਮੇਂ ਦੌਰਾਨ ਕਰਤਾਰ ਦੀ ਐਸੀ ਮਰਜ਼ੀ ਹੋਈ ਕਿ ਗੁਰੂ ਕਾ ਲੰਗਰ ਅਤੁੱਟ ਵਰਤ ਰਿਹਾ ਸੀ ਕਿ ਨੇੜੇ ਹੀ ਝਿੜੀ ਵਿੱਚ ਰਹਿੰਦੇ ਸਾਧੂ ਨੇ ਲੰਗਰ ਛੱਕਣ ਦੇ ਬਹਾਨੇ ਗੁਰੂ ਜੀ ਦੀ ਪਰਖ ਖਾਤਰ ਆਪਣੀ ਚਿੱਪੀ ਵਿੱਚ ਲੰਗਰ ਪਵਾਇਆ ਤੇ ਕਹਿਣ ਲੱਗਾ- "ਅਜੇ ਚਿੱਪੀ ਭਰੀ ਨਹੀਂ ਹੈ, ਹੋਰ ਪਾਓ...." 
ਚਿੱਪੀ ਨਾ ਭਰਦੀ ਦੇਖ ਕੇ ਸੇਵਾਦਾਰ ਗੁਰੂ ਜੀ ਪਾਸ ਜਾ ਕੇ ਅਰਜੋਈ ਕੀਤੀ ਕਿ ਲੰਗਰ ਵਿੱਚ ਸਾਧੂ ਆਇਆ ਹੈ ਅਤੇ ਆਪਣੀ ਚਿੱਪੀ ਵਿੱਚ ਭੋਜਨ ਪਵਾਈ ਜਾ ਰਿਹਾ ਹੈ ਪਰ ਚਿੱਪੀ ਭਰਦੀ ਹੀ ਨਹੀਂ। ਗੁਰੂ ਜੀ ਨੇ ਆਪਣੇ ਕਰ ਕਮਲਾਂ ਨਾਲ ਲੰਗਰ ਦਾ ਇੱਕ ਕਿਣਕਾ ਦੇ ਕੇ ਆਖਿਆ ਇਹ ਉਸਦੀ ਚਿੱਪੀ ਵਿੱਚ ਪਾ ਦਿਓ। ਗੁਰੂ ਦੀ ਛੋਹ ਪ੍ਰਾਪਤ ਇਸ ਕਿਣਕੇ ਦੀ ਚਿੱਪੀ ਵਿੱਚ ਪੈਣ ਦੀ ਦੇਰ ਸੀ ਕਿ ਉਸ ਚਿੱਪੀ ਵਿੱਚੋਂ ਤਰ੍ਹਾਂ-ਤਰ੍ਹਾਂ ਦੇ ਭੋਜਨ ਨਿਕਲਣ ਲੱਗ ਪਏ। ਜਦੋਂ ਸਾਧੂ ਖਾਣ ਲੱਗੇ ਤਾਂ ਚਿੱਪੀ ਬੰਦ ਹੋ ਜਾਵੇ। ਬੜੀ ਕੋਸ਼ਿਸ਼ ਕਰਨ ਦੇ ਬਾਵਜੂਦ ਸਾਧੂ ਭੋਜਨ ਨਾ ਖਾ ਸਕਿਆ। ਅਖੀਰ ਗੁਰੂ ਦੇ ਚਰਨਾਂ ਵਿੱਚ ਢਹਿ ਪਿਆ ਤੇ ਗੁਰੂ ਮਹਾਰਾਜ ਜੀ ਦੀ ਖੁਸ਼ੀ ਪ੍ਰਾਪਤ ਕੀਤੀ- ਅੱਜ ਵੀ ਗੁਰੂਘਰ ਦੀਆਂ ਸੰਗਤਾਂ ਤਨ,ਮਨ ਅਤੇ ਧਨ ਨਾਲ ਸੇਵਾ ਕਰਕੇ ਗੁਰੂਘਰ ਦੀਆਂ ਖੁਸ਼ੀਆਂ ਪ੍ਰਾਪਤ ਕਰ ਰਹੀਆਂ ਹਨ।  ਮੌਜੂਦਾ ਦਰਬਾਰ ਦੀ ਨੀਂਹ 22 ਫੱਗਣ ਸੰਮਤ 2006(ਮਾਰਚ 1950 ਈਸਵੀਂ) ਨੂੰ ਸਰਵ ਸ਼੍ਰੀ ਮਹੰਤ ਸਵਾਮੀ ਕਾਲੀ ਚਰਨ ਪਰਬਤ ਮੱਠ,ਸ.ਮੋਹਣ ਸਿੰਘ ਰਹੀਸ,ਬੂਟਾ ਸਿੰਘ ਅਟਵਾਲ,ਜੋਰਾ ਮੱਲ ਚੱਢਾ ਅਤੇ ਪ੍ਰਿੰਸੀਪਲ ਕਿਰਪਾਲ ਸਿੰਘ ਜੀ ਨੇ ਨੀਂਹ ਰੱਖੀ। 
ਗੁ: ਪ੍ਰਬੰਧਕ ਕਮੇਟੀ ਪਾਤਸ਼ਾਹੀ ਛੇਵੀਂ ਨੇ ਹੁਣ ਵਾਲੀ ਇਮਾਰਤ ਲਗਾਤਾਰ ਮਿਹਨਤ ਅਤੇ ਸੰਗਤਾਂ ਦੇ ਸਹਿਯੋਗ ਨਾਲ ਬਣਾਈ। ਸੰਗਤਾਂ ਦੀ ਸੁਵਿਧਾ ਲਈ ਲੰਗਰ ਹਾਲ ਦੀ ਇਮਾਰਤ ਅਤੇ ਦੀਵਾਨ ਹਾਲ ਤਿਆਰ ਕੀਤਾ ਗਿਆ ਹੈ। ਇਸ ਤੋਂ ਇਲਾਵਾ ਰਸੋਈ ਘਰ ਅਤੇ ਕਾਰ ਪਾਰਕਿੰਗ ਦੀ ਸੁਵਿਧਾ ਵੀ ਉਪਲਬੱਧ ਹੈ। 

ਗੁਰਦੁਆਰਾ ਪ੍ਰਬੰਧਕ ਕਮੇਟੀ ਵੱਲੋਂ, ਸਰਬੱਤ ਦੇ ਭਲੇ ਲਈ ਹਰੇਕ ਸੰਗਰਾਂਦ ਤੇ ਅਖੰਡ ਪਾਠ ਦੇ ਭੋਗ ਪਾਏ ਜਾਂਦੇ ਹਨ ਤੇ ਲੰਗਰ ਵੀ ਲਗਾਇਆ ਜਾਂਦਾ ਹੈ ਅਤੇ ਸਾਰੇ ਗੁਰੂ ਸਾਹਿਬਾਨਾਂ ਦੇ ਗੁਰਪੁਰਬ ਮਨਾਏ ਜਾਂਦੇ ਹਨ। ਗੁਰੂ ਨਾਨਕ ਦੇਵ ਜੀ ਅਤੇ ਗੁਰੂ ਗੋਬਿੰਦ ਸਿੰਘ ਜੀ ਅਤੇ ਗੁਰੂ ਹਰਿਗੋਬਿੰਦ ਸਾਹਿਬ ਜੀ ਦੇ ਪ੍ਰਕਾਸ਼ ਪੁਰਬ ਤੇ ਨਗਰ ਕੀਰਤਨ ਵੀ ਕੱਢੇ ਜਾਂਦੇ ਹਨ। 

ਗੁਰਦੁਆਰਾ ਪ੍ਰਬੰਧਕ ਕਮੇਟੀ ਵੱਲੋਂ ਮਾਨਵਤਾ ਦੇ ਭਲੇ ਲਈ ਚੱਲ ਰਹੀਆਂ ਸੰਸਥਾਵਾਂ- 
(1) ਗੁਰੂ ਹਰਿਗੋਬਿੰਦ ਸਾਹਿਬ ਹੋਮੋਪੈਥਿਕ ਡਿਸਪੈਂਸਰੀ 
(2) ਗੁਰੂ ਹਰਿਗੋਬਿੰਦ ਸਾਹਿਬ ਸਿਲਾਈ ਸੈਂਟਰ ਗੁਰਦੁਆਰਾ ਬਾਉਲੀ ਸਾਹਿਬ

ਗੁਰਦੁਆਰਾ ਪ੍ਰਬੰਧਕ ਕਮੇਟੀ ਹੇਠ ਚੱਲ ਰਹੀਆਂ ਸੰਸਥਾਵਾਂ ਦੀ ਸੇਵਾ ਸੰਭਾਲ- 
(1) ਗੁਰਦੁਆਰਾ ਬਾਉਲੀ ਸਾਹਿਬ
(2) ਗੁਰਦੁਆਰਾ ਖੂਹੀ ਸਾਹਿਬ
(3) ਜੰਝ ਘਰ ਹਦੀਆਬਾਦ 

ਵੱਲੋਂ- ਗੁਰਦੁਆਰਾ ਪ੍ਰਬੰਧਕ ਕਮੇਟੀ ਛੇਵੀਂ ਪਾਤਸ਼ਾਹੀ ਹਦੀਆਬਾਦ, ਫਗਵਾੜਾ, ਕਪੂਰਥਲਾ।।

Written by Head Granthi Geyani Ravinder Singh Gurudwara Patshahi Chhevi, Hadiabad, Phagwara, Kapurthala, Punjab.

Transport
Hadiabad is connected to Phagwara by Hadiabad main road, which starts off from the city centre, past the Adarsh Nagar Flyover and on to Hadiabad main road. Phagwara Junction Railway Station is the closest railhead. Ludhiana,  to the south, has the nearest airport.

References

Kapurthala district